DeShawn Anthony Shead (born June 28, 1989) is a former American football cornerback and current coach. He is a defensive assistant/assistant defensive backs coach for the Seattle Seahawks of the National Football League (NFL). He signed with the Seahawks as an undrafted free agent in 2012, and became a member of the Legion of Boom. He also won Super Bowl XLVIII with the Seahawks over the Denver Broncos. Shead spent the 2018 season with the Detroit Lions, before re-signing with the Seahawks in 2019.

Early years
Born and raised in Palmdale, California, Shead attended Highland High School and was a two-time All-Conference and All-CIF Southern Section defensive back. He was named the winner of the 2006 National Football Foundation Scholar Athlete award. He also competed in track and field at Highland, and still holds the school pole vault record.

College career
Shead played college football at Portland State; he redshirted as a true freshman in 2007, and was named PSU Most Outstanding Defensive Back for the next four  seasons. He was second-team All-Big Sky Conference as a junior and was on the first-team as a senior in 2011.  He also competed in the decathlon on the Vikings track team.

Professional career

Seattle Seahawks
On April 29, 2012, Shead signed with the Seahawks as an undrafted free agent. On August 31, he was released, then was signed to the practice squad the following day. On November 27, 2013, Shead was promoted to the active roster from the practice squad, and participated in Super Bowl XLVIII in February 2014, as the Seahawks defeated the Denver Broncos 43–8.

After Seattle's loss in Super Bowl XLIX in February 2015, cornerback Byron Maxwell left for Philadelphia in free agency, leaving a starting position open opposite All-Pro CB Richard Sherman. The Seahawks signed Cary Williams in the offseason, but he was benched in Week 12 and later released. With Jeremy Lane and Tharold Simon still recovering from injuries, Shead was inserted as the second cornerback against Pittsburgh in place of Williams, and played well enough to earn the starting job full-time. 

In Week 17, Shead recorded his first interception against the Arizona Cardinals, picking off quarterback Drew Stanton in the endzone. He finished the game with an interception, a tackle, and a pass deflection.

In the Divisional Round of the 2016 playoffs, Shead suffered a torn ACL in the  loss to the Atlanta Falcons. He re-signed with the Seahawks on March 17, 2017, and was placed on the physically unable to perform list to start the season. He was activated off the PUP list on December 23, 2017.

On March 12, 2018, Shead was released by the Seahawks.

Detroit Lions
On March 14, 2018, the Detroit Lions signed Shead to a one-year contract worth $3.5 million, with an additional $3 million in incentives. Despite being projected by many analysts to be one of the team's starting cornerbacks for the 2018 season, Shead did not make the 53-man roster and was released on September 1, 2018. He was re-signed on September 19, 2018. He played in 12 games before being placed on injured reserve on December 29, 2018.

Seattle Seahawks (second stint)
On July 27, 2019, Shead signed with the Seattle Seahawks. He was released on August 31, 2019.

New Orleans Saints
On December 24, 2019, Shead was signed by the New Orleans Saints, but was released four days later.

Coaching career
Shead was hired by the Seahawks as a defensive assistant / defensive backs coach on March 3, 2021.

References

External links
 Portland State bio 
 Seattle Seahawks bio 

1989 births
Living people
American football cornerbacks
Detroit Lions players
New Orleans Saints players
People from Palmdale, California
Portland State Vikings football players
Seattle Seahawks coaches
Seattle Seahawks players
Sportspeople from Los Angeles County, California